David Carl Brinnel began working at age 19 as a night club entertainer, performing in venues throughout the northeast. He had the honor of playing piano at two 1984 campaign rallies for then President Ronald Reagan. He went on to establish his own radio and television production company, Sound Gems in 1989, creating commercials for The Disney Store, Casual Corner and many other regional clients. The company was renamed Dave's Creative in 2010.  From 1997 to 2000 he was the host of "The Dave in the Morning Show" on WRNX 100.9FM out of Holyoke, Massachusetts. He is noted for giving Rachel Maddow her first broadcasting job when she won a contest the station was holding to find him a new sidekick. In 2012 he was honored by the Massachusetts Music Educators Association for volunteer efforts on behalf of Glenbrook Middle School in Longmeadow, Massachusetts. He has also written, directed and performed in a musical production, "An Evening of Allan Sherman"; a program celebrating the life and work of 1960s comedic sensation, Allan Sherman. Since 2007 he's collaborated closely with his daughter, Hailey Brinnel, for many projects and performances. In 2018, he released his first studio album, Finally, composed of songs written since 1985. In his 2022 book, Chase the Bears: Little Things to Achieve Big Dreams, former Congressman Ric Keller credits Dave with offering some of his favorite advice.

Discography

References

1960 births
American talk radio hosts
People from Fall River, Massachusetts
Living people